The 3rd Awit Awards were held in Manila Hotel located in the nation's capital, Manila. They gave awards to the outstanding musical achievements for the year 1970.

The award ceremony was originally to be held at the Cultural Center of the Philippines in March 1971. After some meetings, the Philippine Academy of the Recording Arts and Sciences decided to move it to May and would be held at the Araneta Coliseum. Yet again, it was delayed to June due to the elections of the board and the jurors and took place at the Manila Hotel. 

A total of 36 awards were given that night. Nora Aunor, Bert Dominic, the Philippine Rondalla, Vilma Santos and Danny Subido both took home the most number of awards with 2.

Winners

General

People

Instrumental

Music for movies

Composing, lyric writing and arranging

Production

Packaging and notes

Special awards

References

Awit Awards
1971 music awards
1971 in the Philippines